Robert Charles Grenville Perrins (born April 1965) has been Managing Director of Berkeley Group Holdings since September 2009.

He was educated at Marlborough College and has a bachelor's degree in Geological Sciences from Aston University.

He joined Berkeley in 1994, having qualified as a chartered accountant in 1991. He joined the group main board in May 2001, becoming finance director shortly afterwards.

References

1965 births
Living people
People educated at Marlborough College
Alumni of Aston University
Berkeley Group Holdings people